Louis John Secco (January 18, 1927 – October 27, 2008) was a Canadian ice hockey player. He was a member of the Edmonton Mercurys that won a gold medal at the 1952 Winter Olympics in Oslo, Norway.

External links
Biography at databaseOlympics.com
Louis Secco's profile at Sports Reference.com

1927 births
2008 deaths
Ice hockey players at the 1952 Winter Olympics
Medalists at the 1952 Winter Olympics
Olympic gold medalists for Canada
Olympic ice hockey players of Canada
Olympic medalists in ice hockey
Sportspeople from Trail, British Columbia
Ice hockey people from British Columbia
Canadian ice hockey left wingers